Xiangshuiyuan Subdistrict is a subdistrict at the western part of Yanqing District, Beijing, China. It shares border with Yanqing Town to its north and east, Baiquan Subdistrict to its south, and Rulin Subdistrict to its west. In 2020, the subdistrict had 48,251.

The subdistrict was created from part of Yanqing Town in 2009. Its name literally means "Perfume Garden".

Geography 
Xiangshuiyuan Subdistrict is on the northern bank of Guishui River.

Administrative divisions 
Below is a list of the 16 communities that made up Xiangshuiyuan Subdistrict at the end of 2021:

Gallery

See also 

 List of township-level divisions of Beijing

References 

Subdistricts of Beijing
Yanqing District